The 54th Fighter Squadron is an inactive United States Air Force unit.  Its last assignment was to the 3d Operations Group, being stationed at Elmendorf Air Force Base, Alaska. It was inactivated on 28 April 2000.

History

World War II
Activated on 15 Jan 1941 at Hamilton Field, California as a Curtiss P-40 Warhawk pursuit unit as part of the defense buildup of the United States prior to World War II.

Deployed to Alaska in mid-1942 and engaged the Japanese during the Aleutian Campaign during World War II.  Engaged in combat in the Aleutians, 1942–1943 with long-range Lockheed P-38 Lightnings. Remained in Alaska after the removal of Japanese forces, flying long range escorts for B-24 Liberator bombing attacks of northern Japanese Kurile Islands, inactivated in 1946.

Air Defense

Reactivated in 1952 at Rapid City Air Force Base, South Dakota, assuming the personnel and aircraft of the 175th Fighter-Interceptor Squadron, a North Dakota Air National Guard that had been called to active service for the Korean War and which returned to state control. Mission was to provide air defense for North Central United States. Assumed ANG North American F-51D Mustangs, upgraded to Republic F-84D Thunderjet jet aircraft being returned from combat in Korea in July 1953.  Upgraded to F-84Gs in December 1953; upgraded to North American F-86D Sabre in April 1954; upgraded to Northrop F-89J Scorpion interceptors in 1957.  Inactivated on 25 December 1960.

Return to Alaska
Reactivated as a McDonnell Douglas F-15 Eagle air superiority squadron in Alaska in 1987, it provided air defense until being inactivated in 2000.

Lineage
 Constituted as the 54th Pursuit Squadron (Interceptor) on 20 November 1940
 Activated on 15 January 1941
 Redesignated 54th Pursuit Squadron (Interceptor) (Twin Engine) on 31 January 1942
 Redesignated 54th Fighter Squadron (Twin Engine) on 15 May 1942
 Redesignated 54th Fighter Squadron, Two Engine on 20 Aug 1943
 Inactivated on 21 Mar 1946
 Redesignated 54th Fighter-Interceptor Squadron on 10 October 1952
 Activated on 1 December 1952
 Discontinued and inactivated on 25 December 1960
 Redesignated 54th Tactical Fighter Squadron on 13 January 1987
 Activated on 8 May 1987
 Redesignated 54th Fighter Squadron on 26 September 1991
 Inactivated on 28 April 2000

Assignments
 55th Pursuit Group (later 55th Fighter Group), 15 Jan 1941 (attached to XI Fighter Command after 31 May 1942)
 343d Fighter Group, 11 September 1942 – 21 March 1946
 31st Air Division, 1 December 1952
 29th Air Division, 16 February 1953 – 25 December 1960
 21st Tactical Fighter Wing, 8 May 1987
 21st Operations Group, 26 September 1991
 3d Operations Group, 19 December 1991 – 28 April 2000

Stations
 Hamilton Field, California, 15 January 1941
 Portland Army Air Base, Oregon, 22 May 1941
 Paine Field, Washington, 22 January – 25 May 1942
 Elmendorf Field, Alaska, 31 May–c. 24 August 1942
 Detachments at Fort Randall Army Air Field, Alaska, c. 6 Jun-c. 31 Jul 1942 and Fort Glenn Army Air Base, Alaska, c. 6 June–c. 19 September 1942
 Adak Army Air Field, Alaska, c. 31 August 1942
 Amchitka Army Air Field, Alaska, 12 March 1943
 Shemya Army Air Field, Alaska, c. 18 October 1943
 Alexai Point Army Air Field, Attu, Alaska, c. 20 November 1943 – 8 March 1946
 Fort Lawton, Washington, 20–21 March 1946
 Rapid City Air Force Base (later Ellsworth Air Force Base), South Dakota, 1 December 1952 – 25 December 1960
 Elmendorf Air Force Base, Alaska, 8 May 1987 – 28 April 2000

Aircraft

 Seversky P-35, 1941–1942
 Curtiss P-40 Warhawk, 1941–1942
 Republic P-43 Lancer, 1941–1942
 Lockheed F-5 Lightning, 1943
 Lockheed P-38 Lightning, 1942–1946
 North American F-51D Mustang, 1952–1953
 Republic F-84G Thunderjet, 1953–1954
 North American F-86D Sabre, 1954–1957
 Northrop F-89J Scorpion, 1957–1960
 McDonnell Douglas F-15C Eagle, 1987–2000
 McDonnell Douglas F-15D Eagle, 1987–2000

References

 Notes

 Citations

Bibliography

External links

054
Aleutian Islands campaign
Military units and formations in Alaska
054